Miss Indonesia 2011 is the seventh edition of Miss Indonesia beauty pageant. It features the theme of Ragam Cantik Indonesia (Indonesian: Variety of Indonesian beauty). The pageant was held at Central Park, Jakarta on June 3, 2011 and was hosted by Ferdie Hasan and Sandra Angelia. The current titleholder of Miss World, Alexandria Mills attended the awarding night,  when Asyifa Latief of West Java crowned her successor, Astrid Ellena Indriana Yunadi from East Java.

Results

Placements

Fast track winners 
Fast track events are held during preliminary round and the winners of Fast Track events are automatically qualified to enter the semifinal round. This year's fast track events include: talent, sport, and modeling.

 Bangka-Belitung Islands - Eviliana (Talent)
  Central Kalimantan - Madhina Nur Muthia (Sport)
 West Kalimantan - Kayla Natalia Haman (Modelling)

Special awards

Judges
 Liliana Tanoesoedibjo
 Martha Tilaar
 Harry Darsono
 Tantowi Yahya
 Ferry Salim

Contestants
A total of 33 contestants representing all 33 provinces of Indonesia competed during the pageant. They were selected through an audition in six cities across the country, i.e.: Yogyakarta, Denpasar, Surabaya, Bandung, Makassar, and Jakarta.

Crossovers
Miss Indonesia Earth
2013 : West Java - Nita Sofiani (winner)
2014: East Nusa Tenggara - Dikna Faradiba Maharani (Top 10)

Puteri Indonesia
2017 : Jakarta SCR - Fatya Ginanjarsari (unplaced) ~represented North Kalimantan
2017 : Riau Islands - Astari Aslam (unplaced) ~represented Riau

References

External links
 Official site
 

2011 beauty pageants
2011 in Indonesia
Miss Indonesia